Ujjal Howladar (born 1 November 1993) is an Indian professional footballer who plays as a midfielder for Mohun Bagan on loan from Techno Aryan in the I-League.

Career

Mohun Bagan
On 7 January 2014 Howladar signed for Mohun Bagan on loan from Techno Aryan. He made his professional debut for Mohun Bagan in the Indian Federation Cup on 18 January 2014 against Shillong Lajong at the Jawaharlal Nehru Stadium, Kochi in which he came on as a substitute for Zakeer Mundampara in the 75th minute as Mohun Bagan won the match 6–0.

Career statistics

References

External links 
 Profile at Goal.com

1986 births
Living people
Indian footballers
Aryan FC players
Mohun Bagan AC players
Association football midfielders
Footballers from West Bengal
I-League players